Chapi (possibly from Quechua for tin) or Ch'api (possibly from Aymara for thorn) is a  mountain in the Apolobamba mountain range in the Andes of Peru. It is located in the Puno Region, Putina Province, on the border of the districts Ananea and Sina. Chapi is situated southeast of the mountains Ananea and Ritipata, north-west of Riti Urmasca and north-east of the lake Asnococha.

References 

Mountains of Peru
Mountains of Puno Region